The 1971 South African Grand Prix, formally the Fifth AA Grand Prix of South Africa (Afrikaans: Vyfde AA Suid-Afrikaanse Grand Prix), was a Formula One motor race held at Kyalami Circuit on 6 March 1971. It was race 1 of 11 in both the 1971 World Championship of Drivers and the 1971 International Cup for Formula One Manufacturers. The race was won by Mario Andretti who was driving for the Ferrari team in what was his first Formula One victory, but would not win another Formula One race until .

Report

Jackie Stewart took pole in the Tyrrell to join Chris Amon and Regazzoni on the front row. Denny Hulme was suffering with a new suspension that he said was behaving very strangely.

At the start, Regazzoni led the field away at the start – both Stewart and Amon suffering slow starts. Emerson Fittipaldi managed to hold off Hulme until lap three when he dived through to chase the Ferraris. On lap 17, he squeezed through under braking and the orange McLaren once again led a race. Pedro Rodríguez was forced to retire from fourth place when his bodywork started to melt and the hot air began burning his feet. The heat also took its toll on Jo Siffert, whose engine overheated and Howden Ganley who was taken ill with heat exhaustion. On lap 37, John Surtees who had steadily been moving up the field, managed to pass Regazzoni. Surtees however, suffered a gearbox failure on lap 57. Andretti took his first career victory, driving a Ferrari; his teammate Regazzoni finished in third place behind Stewart.

Classification

Qualifying

Race

Championship standings after the race 

Drivers' Championship standings

Constructors' Championship standings

Note: Only the top five positions are included for both sets of standings.

References

External links

South African Grand Prix
Grand Prix
South African Grand Prix
March 1971 sports events in Africa